General Roca Department may refer to:
General Roca Department, Río Negro
General Roca Department, Córdoba

Department name disambiguation pages